Agüero is a Spanish surname, it may refer to:

People
 Andrés Rivero Agüero (1905–1997), Cuban politician
 Bidal Aguero (1949–2009), Hispanic political activist and newspaper publisher in Lubbock, Texas
 Carolina Agüero (born 1975), Argentine ballerina
 Ezequiel Agüero (born 1994), Malaysian footballer
 Fernando Agüero (1920–2011), Nicaraguan politician
 José de la Riva Agüero (1783–1858), Peruvian soldier and politician
 Juan Miguel de Agüero ( 16th century), Mexican architect
 Sergio Agüero (born 1988), Argentine footballer
 Taismary Agüero (born 1977), Cuban-Italian volleyball player
 Zenón Noriega Agüero (1900–1957), Peruvian army general

Places
 Agüero, Huesca, a town in the province of Huesca, Spain
 Calle Agüero, a street in Buenos Aires, Argentina
 Agüero (Buenos Aires Metro), a metro station in Buenos Aires, Argentina

See also
 Agüera (disambiguation)

Spanish-language surnames